The National Soccer League of New York (also known as the National League of New York) was an amateur U.S. soccer league which served as a lower division for the de facto first division American Soccer League from the 1920s into the 1950s.  The league began to decline in the second half of the twentieth century and was displaced by the German American Soccer League (GASL) as the dominant New York amateur league.  In 1974, the NSL merged with the GASL.

History
Much of the early history of the league remains obscure.  However, in 1928 an NSL select team played Scottish club Rangers F.C. in Brooklyn.  Rangers won that game 8-2.  In 1941, another NSL select team toured Haiti during which it played a team featuring future National Soccer Hall of Fame forward Joe Gaetjens.  This led to him moving to the U.S. and subsequently scoring the winning goal in the U.S. victory over England in the 1950 FIFA World Cup.  In 1974, the NSL merged with the German American Soccer League.

Champions
 1939  Danish
 1940  Swedish
 1941  Healy
 1942  Bigelow Sanford
 1943-1945 No competition
 1947  Bigelow-Sanford
 1948  Segura F. C
 1949  Segura FC
 1950  Paterson F.C.
 1951  Paterson F.C.
 1952  Paterson F.C.
 1953  Ukrainian Americans
 1954  Gjoa
 1955  Ukrainian
 1956  Brooklyn Italians
 1961  Gjoa
 1962  Gjoa
 1964  Brooklyn Celtic
 1966  Brooklyn Celtic
 1968  Maccabi
 1969  Palermo
 1972  Palermo

External links
 Year by year history of soccer in the U.S.

Soccer in New York (state)
Defunct soccer leagues in the United States
Sports competitions in New York (state)